Mordellistena abrupta is a species of beetle in the genus Mordellistena of the family Mordellidae. It was discovered in 1944.

References

abrupta
Beetles described in 1944